Manfred Meurer (8 September 1919 – 22 January 1944) was a German Luftwaffe military aviator during World War II, a night fighter ace credited with 65 aerial victories claimed in 130 combat missions making him the fifth most successful night fighter pilot in the history of aerial warfare. All of his victories were claimed over the Western Front in Defense of the Reich missions against the Royal Air Force's (RAF) Bomber Command.

Born in Hamburg, Meurer grew up in the Weimar Republic and Nazi Germany. Following graduation from school and the compulsory Reichsarbeitsdienst (Reich Labour Service), he joined the military service in 1938, at first with an anti aircraft artillery regiment before being trained as a pilot. Meurer then served with Zerstörergeschwader 76 (ZG 76—76th Destroyer Wing), flying a Messerschmitt Bf 110 heavy fighter. In October 1941, he transferred to Nachtjagdgeschwader 1 (NJG 1—1st Night Fighter Wing) where he became a night fighter pilot and claimed his first aerial victory on the night of 26/27 March 1942. Meurer was appointed squadron leader of 3. Staffel (3rd squadron) of NJG 1 in January 1943. Following his 50th aerial victory, he was awarded the Knight's Cross of the Iron Cross with Oak Leaves on 2 August 1943. The Knight's Cross, and its variants were the highest awards in the military and paramilitary forces of Nazi Germany during World War II. On 5 August 1943, he was appointed group commander of II. Gruppe of Nachtjagdgeschwader 5 (NJG 5—5th Night Fighter Wing). Meurer and his crew were killed in action in a mid-air collision with a RAF bomber on the night of 21/22 January 1944.

Early life and career
Meurer, the son of sports editor-in-chief Georg Meurer, was born on 8 September 1919 in Hamburg, at the time a sovereign state of the German Empire. After attending school and passing his Abitur (School Leaving Certificate) and compulsory Reichsarbeitsdienst (Reich Labour Service), he joined the military service of Nazi Germany in 1938. He initially served with Flak-Regiment 6 (6th anti aircraft artillery regiment) of the Luftwaffe as a Fahnenjunker (officer cadet).

World War II
World War II in Europe began on Friday 1 September 1939 when German forces invaded Poland. Following the outbreak of war, Meurer was accepted for flight training and was promoted to Leutnant (second lieutenant) on 1 April 1940. From the Heeresaufklärern (army aerial reconnaissance), he was posted to II. Gruppe (2nd group) of Zerstörergeschwader 76 (ZG 76—76th Destroyer Wing). In Oktober 1941, he transferred to III. Gruppe (3rd group) of Nachtjagdgeschwader 1 (NJG 1—1st Night Fighter Wing) where he became a night fighter pilot. There, he was assigned to the 9. Staffel (9th squadron) of NJG 1.

Night fighter career

Following the 1939 aerial Battle of the Heligoland Bight, Royal Air Force (RAF) attacks shifted to the cover of darkness, initiating the Defence of the Reich campaign. By mid-1940, Generalmajor (Brigadier General) Josef Kammhuber had established a night air defense system dubbed the Kammhuber Line. It consisted of a series of control sectors equipped with radars and searchlights and an associated night fighter. Each sector named a Himmelbett (canopy bed) would direct the night fighter into visual range with target bombers. In 1941, the Luftwaffe started equipping night fighters with airborne radar such as the Lichtenstein radar. This airborne radar did not come into general use until early 1942.

For this, he was awarded the Iron Cross 2nd Class on 17 April 1942. The Hampden was identified as P2116 from the RAF No. 14 Operational Training Unit. He shot down a Handley Page Halifax at 01:54 on 2/3 June 1942 claimed near Emmerich. At 04:17 on 15/16 August 1942, Meurer claimed a Wellington shot down at Rozendaal. Meurer claimed his last aerial victory in 1942 on the night of 15/16 October. Credited with eight victories, he was awarded the Iron Cross 1st Class on 19 December 1942.

Staffelkapitän
On 1 January 1943, Meurer was appointed Staffelkapitän (squadron leader) of 3. Staffel (3rd squadron) of NJG 1. His first victory of 1943 was claimed on the night of 3/4 January. The aircraft was Lancaster "U-Uncle" from No. 207 Squadron piloted by Flight Sergeant 'Barry' Chaster. In the attack, four crew members were killed.

On 14/15 February 1943, he claimed three heavy bombers, two Halifax and one Wellington. The second was believed to have been shot down at 20:20 north-northeast of Maastricht. Meurer claimed two bombers shot down on 26/27 February 1943.

Battle of the Ruhr
In March 1943, RAF Bomber Command, under the command of Air Chief Marshal Sir Arthur Harris, initiated a 5-month long campaign of strategic bombing targeting the industrial centres in the Ruhr Area. This series of bombing attacks, dubbed the Battle of the Ruhr (5 March 1943 – 31 July 1943), caused heavy damage to German industry. The Battle of the Ruhr began with a 442-aircraft attack on Essen on the night of 5/6 March 1943. On 12/13 March 1943, as RAF Bomber Command targeted the Krupp factory in Essen, Meurer claimed four aerial victories, two Halifax, one Lancaster, and one Wellington. Credited with 23 aerial victories, Meurer was awarded the Honour Goblet of the Luftwaffe on 15 March 1943, the German Cross in Gold on 31 March 1943, and the Knight's Cross of the Iron Cross on 16 April 1943.

In May 1943, Meuerer was credited with 14 more aerial victories, which included one on 12/13 May, another the next night, three on 23/24 May, again three on 25/26 May, two on 27/28 May, and four on 29/30 May. On 13/14 May at 02:31, a Halifax was claimed in an unknown location. On 21/22 June 1943, Bomber command targeted Krefeld, losing 44 aircraft in the attack. That night, Meurer shot down two bombers, one from No. 83 Squadron and another from No. 77 Squadron. Meurer's aircraft was hit by defensive fire of his second opponent, forcing him to bail out. Flying a specialized Junkers Ju 88 with GM-1 power boost, Meurer was credited with his 50th aerial victory over De Havilland Mosquito IV DZ458 from No. 139 Squadron on 27/28 July 1943.

Gruppenkommandeur

On 2 August 1943, Meurer was awarded the Knight's Cross of the Iron Cross with Oak Leaves. The presentation was made by Adolf Hitler at the Wolf's Lair, Hitler's headquarters in Rastenburg, present-day Kętrzyn in Poland on 10/11 August. Five other Luftwaffe officers were presented with awards that day by Hitler, Hauptmann Egmont Prinz zur Lippe-Weißenfeld, Hauptmann Heinrich Ehrler, Oberleutnant Joachim Kirschner, Hauptmann Werner Schröer, Oberleutnant Theodor Weissenberger were also awarded the Oak Leaves, and Major Helmut Lent received the Swords to his Knight's Cross with Oak Leaves.

On 5 August 1943, Meurer was appointed Gruppenkommandeur (group commander) of II. Gruppe of Nachtjagdgeschwader 5 (NJG 5—5th Night Fighter Wing), replacing Hauptmann Rudolf Schoenert who was transferred. On 23/24 August 1943, Meurer claimed a Lancaster at 00:58 over the eastern area of Berlin and a second Lancaster at 01:38 at Fürstenberg/Havel. He returned to NJG 1 on 28 September 1943 as Gruppenkommandeur of I. Gruppe. He replaced Hauptmann Hans-Dieter Frank who was killed in action. I. Gruppe flew the Heinkel He 219 and Meurer gained five victories flying this type. At 20:05 on 18/19 October 1943, he claimed a Lancaster for his 57th aerial victory at Erichshagen. Near Bühne and Haarbrück on the night of 22/23 October 1943, he claimed a Lancaster shot down at 21:20.

Battle of Berlin and death
In November 1943, Bomber Command initiated the aerial bombing campaign on Berlin. During the Battle of Berlin (18 November 1943 – 31 March 1944), the RAF also targeted other German cities to prevent the concentration of defences. At the start of this campaign, Meurer with his I. Gruppe were based at Venlo Airfield. Meurer was credited with his 60th aerial victory on 12/13 December 1943 for a claim made at 19:25 over a Mosquito west of Zaltbommel. The Mosquito was DZ354 from No. 105 Squadron piloted by Flying Officer Benjamin Frank Reynolds and Flying Officer John Douglass Phillips, both killed in action. On 16/17 December 1943, he claimed his 61st and 62nd victory. The 61st claim was made at 19:25 over an aircraft of unknown type and position. His 62nd claim was over a Lancaster at an unknown time and location.

His He 219 A-0 (Werknummer 190070—factory number) "G9+BB" crashed and Meurer, his radar operator Oberfeldwebel Gerhard Scheibe, the first radio operator of the night fighter force to have received the Knight's Cross of the Iron Cross, and all seven members of the Lancaster crew, were killed in action. Meurer had been credited with 65 nocturnal victories, including 40 four-engined bombers and two Mosquitos,  claimed in 130 combat missions. On 31 January 1944, Meurer was given a military funeral on the Ohlsdorf Cemetery in Hamburg.

Summary of career

Aerial victory claims
According to US historian David T. Zabecki, Meurer was credited with 65 aerial victories. Foreman, Mathews and Parry, authors of Luftwaffe Night Fighter Claims 1939 – 1945, researched the German Federal Archives and found records for 65 nocturnal victory claims, numerically ranging from 1 to 61, 61, 65, 63 and 64. According to Bowman, Meurer shot down Mosquito IV DZ458 from No. 139 Squadron on 27/28 July 1943. This claim is not documented by Foreman, Mathews and Parry. Mathews and Foreman also published Luftwaffe Aces — Biographies and Victory Claims, listing Meurer with 62 claims.

{| class="wikitable plainrowheaders collapsible" style="margin-left: auto; margin-right: auto; border: none; text-align:right; width: 100%;"
|-
! colspan="7" | Chronicle of aerial victories
|-
| colspan="7" style="text-align: left;" |

|-
!scope="col"| Claim
!scope="col" style="width:150px"| Date
!scope="col"| Time
!scope="col"| Type
!scope="col"| Location
!scope="col"| Serial No./Squadron No.
|-
! colspan="6" | – 9. Staffel of Nachtjagdgeschwader 1 –
|-
| 1
| 27 March 1942
| 00:10
| Wellington
|
|-
! colspan="6" | – Stab III. Gruppe of Nachtjagdgeschwader 1 –
|-
| 2
| 31 May 1942
| 02:05
| Hampden
| Hampden P2116/No. 14 Operational Training Unit RAF
|-
| 3
| 3 June 1942
| 01:54
| Halifax
| near Emmerich
| Lancaster R5562/No. 61 Squadron RAF
|-
| 4
| 16 August 1942
| 04:17
| Wellington
| Rozendaal
| Wellington DF666/No. 156 Squadron RAF
|-
| 5
| 11 September 1942
| 00:06
| Wellington
| Wellington DV890/No. 11 Operational Training Unit RAF
|-
| 6
| 14 September 1942
| 03:26
| Lancaster
|
|-
| 7
| 1 October 1942
| 21:47
| Wellington
|
|-
| 8
| 15 October 1942
| 21:47
| Halifax
| Halifax W1108/No. 158 Squadron RAF
|-
! colspan="6" | – 3. Staffel of Nachtjagdgeschwader 1 –
|-
| 9
| 3 January 1943
| 20:23
| Lancaster
| Lancaster W4134/No. 207 Squadron RAF
|-
| 10
| 27 January 1943
| 20:53
| Halifax
| Handel
| Halifax DT721/No. 51 Squadron RAF
|-
| 11
| 3 February 1943
| 20:41
| Stirling
| Stirling BF406/No. 218 (Gold Coast) Squadron RAF
|-
| 12
| 14 February 1943
| 20:05
| Halifax
| 
|-
| 13
| 14 February 1943
| 20:20
| Halifax
| north-northeast Maastricht
| Halifax DT788/No. 10 Squadron RAF
|-
| 14
| 14 February 1943
| 21:06
| Wellington
|
|-
| 15
| 26 February 1943
| 21:18
| Lancaster
| Lancaster W4846/No. 83 Squadron RAF
|-
| 16
| 26 February 1943
| 21:35
| Wellington
| Wellington Z1599/No. 426 Squadron RCAF
|-
| 17
| 1 March 1943
| 23:56
| Lancaster
| Lancaster ED423/No. 50 Squadron RAF
|-
| 18
| 5 March 1943
| 20:57
| Halifax
| west Düsseldorf
|
|-
| 19
| 5 March 1943
| 21:20
| Wellington	
| Wellington BK150/No. 300 Polish Bomber Squadron
|-
| 20
| 12 March 1943
| 21:16
| Halifax
| northwest Venlo
| Halifax HR692/No. 10 Squadron RAF
|-
| 21
| 12 March 1943
| 21:25
| Lancaster
| Lancaster ED449/No. 50 Squadron RAF
|-
| 22
| 12 March 1943
| 21:48
| Halifax
| Grafwegen
|
|-
| 23
| 12 March 1943
| 22:25
| Wellington
|
|-
| 24
| 13 May 1943
| 02:10
| Wellington
|
|-
| 25
| 14 May 1943
| 02:31
| Halifax
|
|
|-
| 26
| 24 May 1943
| 01:55
| Wellington
| Wellington HE655/No. 166 Squadron RAF
|-
| 27
| 24 May 1943
| 02:12
| Wellington
| east Essen
| Wellington HZ582/No. 199 Squadron RAF
|-
| 28
| 24 May 1943
| 02:33
| Lancaster
| Lancaster W4919/No. 101 Squadron RAF
|-
| 29
| 26 May 1943
| 01:24
| Wellington
| Oostrum
|
|-
| 30
| 26 May 1943
| 01:36
| Lancaster
|
|-
| 31
| 26 May 1943
| 02:08
| Lancaster
|
|-
| 32
| 28 May 1943
| 00:38
| Lancaster
|
|-
| 33
| 28 May 1943
| 01:30
| Wellington
|
|-
| 34
| 30 May 1943
| 00:33
| Halifax
|
|-
| 35
| 30 May 1943
| 00:50
| Wellington
|
|-
| 36
| 30 May 1943
| 01:09
| Stirling
| southeast Roermond
|
|-
| 37
| 30 May 1943
| 01:44
| Lancaster
| Lancaster EE123/No. 44 Squadron RAFPeter Grattan Holt RCAF and crew KIA
|-
| 38
| 12 June 1943
| 01:14
| Wellington
| Coesfeld
|
|-
| 39
| 12 June 1943
| 01:40
| Halifax
| Zutphen
|
|-
| 40
| 12 June 1943
| 01:55
| Halifax
| Halifax JD143/No. 419 Squadron RCAF
|-
| 41
| 13 June 1943
| 01:14
| Lancaster
| Beaumetz
|
|-
| 42
| 15 June 1943
| 01:02
| Lancaster
| Hünshoven
| Lancaster W4936/No. 44 Squadron RAF
|-
| 43
| 15 June 1943
| 01:11
| Lancaster
| east-southeast Sittard
|
|-
| 44
| 15 June 1943
| 01:15
| Lancaster
|
|-
| 45
| 17 June 1943
| 00:55
| Lancaster
| southwest Krüchen
|
|-
| 46
| 17 June 1943
| 01:20
| Lancaster
|
|-
| 47
| 17 June 1943
| 01:41
| Lancaster
| south Boerdonk
| Lancaster ED497/No. 49 Squadron RAF
|-
| 48
| 17 June 1943
| 01:55
| Lancaster
|
|-
| 49
| 22 June 1943
| 01:23
| Lancaster
|
|-
| 50
| 22 June 1943
| 01:48
| Halifax
|
|-
! colspan="6" | – Stab II. 'Gruppe of Nachtjagdgeschwader 5 –
|-
| 51
| 24 August 1943
| 00:58
| Lancaster
| eastern part Berlin
|
|-
| 52
| 24 August 1943
| 01:38
| Lancaster
| Oranienburg/Fürstenberg
|
|-
| 53
| 1 September 1943
| 01:00
| Lancaster
|
|-
| 54
| 7 September 1943
| 00:40
| Lancaster
| south Munich
| Lancaster JB177/No. 156 Squadron RAF
|-
| 55
| 7 September 1943
| 00:50
| Lancaster
| Halifax JB921/No. 102 Squadron RAF
|-
| 56
| 28 September 1943
| 23:20
| B-17
| south Hanover
|
|-
! colspan="6" | – Stab I. Gruppe of Nachtjagdgeschwader 1 –
|-
| 57
| 18 October 1943
| 20:05
| Lancaster
| Erichshagen
|
|-
| 58
| 22 October 1943
| 21:20
| Lancaster
| Bühne-Haarbrück
|
|-
| 59
| 3 November 1943
| 20:15
| Halifax
|
|-
| 60
| 12 December 1943
| 19:25
| Mosquito
| Herwijnen
| Mosquito DZ354/No. 105 Squadron RAF
|-
| style="background:#ffdead" | 61!
| 16 December 1943
| 19:25
| Lancaster
|
|
|-
| style="background:#ffdead" | 62!
| 16/17 December 1943
| 
| Lancaster
|
|
|-
| style="background:#ffdead" | 63!
| 1/2 January 1944
| 
| Lancaster
|
|
|-
| 64
| 22 January 1944
| 23:10
| Halifax
| Magdeburg
|
|-
| 65
| 22 January 1944
| 23:50
| Lancaster
| Lancaster W4852/No. 15 Squadron RAF
|}

Awards
 Iron Cross (1939)
 2nd Class (17 April 1942)
 1st Class (19 December 1942)
 Honour Goblet of the Luftwaffe (Ehrenpokal der Luftwaffe) on 15 March 1943 as Oberleutnant and pilot
 German Cross in Gold on 31 March 1943 as Oberleutnant in the 3./Nachtjagdgeschwader 1
 Knight's Cross of the Iron Cross with Oak Leaves
 Knight's Cross on 16 April 1943 as Oberleutnant and Staffelkapitän of the 3./Nachtjagdgeschwader 1
 264th Oak Leaves on 2 August 1943 as Hauptmann and Staffelkapitän of the 3./Nachtjagdgeschwader'' 1

Notes

References

Citations

Bibliography

 
 
 
 
 
 
 
 
 
 
 
 
 
 
 
 
 
 
 
 
 
 
 
 
 
 
 
 
 
 
 
 
 
 
 
 
 
 
 
 
 
 
 
 
 
 
 
 

1919 births
1944 deaths
Military personnel from Hamburg
Luftwaffe pilots
German World War II flying aces
Luftwaffe personnel killed in World War II
Recipients of the Gold German Cross
Recipients of the Knight's Cross of the Iron Cross with Oak Leaves
Burials at the Ohlsdorf Cemetery
Reich Labour Service members
Aviators killed in aviation accidents or incidents in Germany